Happy Bivouac (officially Happy Bivouac on the Hillari Step) is an album released by Japanese band the pillows on December 2, 1999. It marks the band's first record with Jun Suzuki from The Chewinggum Weekend on bass, who would play with the pillows for over 15 year until his dismissal in 2015. The album was produced by Zin Yoshida of Salon Music. As with its predecessor Runners High, several songs from the album were used for the anime series FLCL.

Happy Bivouac contains several references to the American band Pixies. Track 8 is named after Pixies bassist Kim Deal and at the end of "Back Seat Dog", the pillows can be heard singing the chorus of "Here Comes Your Man" from the album Doolittle. "Crazy Sunshine" and "Funny Bunny", had already been written during the production of LITTLE BUSTERS, and producer Jin Yoshida had instructed to complete them with lyrics. However, Yamanaka was adamant that he couldn't fill in the lyrics in time, so the song was cancelled, and instead, Hello, Welcome to Bubbletown's Happy Zoo (instant show) and LITTLE BUSTERS, were used instead.

Track listing

Personnel

the pillows 
Sawao Yamanaka — Guitar, vocals
 Yoshiaki Manabe — Guitar
 Shinichiro Sato — drums
Additional musicians
 Jun Suzuki - Bass

References

 Happy Bivouac Cover Insert

External links
 Happy Bivouac at the pillows official web site

The Pillows albums
1999 albums